Dobrá čtvrť (The Good District) is Czech drama TV series, which ran from 2005 to 2008.

Plot
18-year-old Zuzana must deal with leaving her friends behind, as her family moves from a palatial villa to a confining apartment. However, she will not miss Michal, the neighborhood bully. She prepares for her senior year at school and graduating at its end, when she learns she has a new classmate—Michal.

Cast
Martha Issová .... Katka Erhartová
Anna Kulovaná .... Zuzana Haselbachová
Pavel Trojan .... Honza Opelík
Přemysl Boublík .... Michal Koreň
Tomáš Hanák .... Ondřej Erhart
Milan Bahúl .... Peter Koreň
Vilma Cibulková .... Simona Koreňová
Jana Preissová .... Jarmila Svobodová
Zdeněk Žák .... Vojtěch Haselbach
Jiří Bartoška .... Martin Palouš (2nd Season, 2008)
Jan Dolanský .... Bondy (2nd Season, 2008)
Veronika Gajerová .... Jiřina Haselbachová
Barbora Srncová .... Janka Kopičková
Alice Görnerová .... Alice Kopecká
Jiří Pecha .... grandfather Opelík
Milan Šteindler .... school janitor
Liliya Malkina .... housekeeper
Jiřina Jirásková .... Mrs. Svobodová's mother
Tereza Nekudová .... Linda
František Němec .... Vladimír, Jarmila's boyfriend
David Švehlík .... teacher Prachař (2nd Season, 2008)
Anna Pošmourná .... Bára Kopecká
Predrag Bjelać .... Dragan (2nd Season 2008)
Simona Babčáková .... barman
Hana Maciuchová .... Jarmila's friend
Karel Smyczek, director
Lucie Konášová, writer

External links
Website (in Czech)
IMDb.com

Czech drama television series
2005 Czech television series debuts
2008 Czech television series endings
Czech Television original programming